Balam Pardesia is a Bhojpuri film released in 1979, directed by Nazir Hussain.  The actors were Rakesh Pandey and Padma Khanna.

The songs of the film were popular even in non-Bhojpuri area.  Two famous songs from the film are, "Gorki ptarki re" and "Chadhte Phalgun", both sung by Mohd Rafi.

Cast

 Rakesh Pandey
 Padma Khanna
 Leela Mishra
 Tun Tun

Soundtrack
 (mukesh kumar, Asha bhosle)
 (Md.Rafi)
 (Asha Bhosle)
 (Md.Rafi)
 (Asha Bhosle)
 (Md.Rafi)

See also 
 Bhojpuri Film Industry
 List of Bhojpuri films

References

External links
 

1979 films
Films directed by Nasir Hussain
1970s Bhojpuri-language films